Michał Protasewicz (born 26 September 1985) is a Polish footballer who is deployed as a defender.

Career

Etar
On 16 January 2013, Protasewicz joined Bulgarian A PFG club Etar 1924.

References

External links

1985 births
Living people
Polish footballers
Flota Świnoujście players
FC Etar 1924 Veliko Tarnovo players
First Professional Football League (Bulgaria) players
Expatriate footballers in Bulgaria
People from Knurów
Sportspeople from Silesian Voivodeship
Germania Gladbeck players
Association football fullbacks
Association football midfielders